Shek Chau is the name of two islands in Hong Kong:

 Shek Chau, Islands District, part of the Soko Islands group of islands, in Islands District
 Shek Chau, Sai Kung District, in Port Shelter, Sai Kung District